This is a list of television programs formerly and currently broadcast by the Canadian television channel The Pet Network.

Current programming
This a list of programs currently being broadcast regularly, as of November 2007.

Final programming

0–9
100 Deeds for Eddie McDowd

A–E
The Adventures of Black Stallion
Amazing Tales
Animal Airport
Animal Allies
Animal Crackers
Animal Doctor
Animal House
Animal Magnetism
Animal Miracles
Animal Movie Magic
Animal Rescue
Animal SOS
Animalia
Bark Off!
Baman Piderman
Dogs

F–J
Good Dog
Harry's Mad
Here's Boomer

K–O
The Life and Times of Grizzly Adams
Life with Pets
Mickey's Farm, a.k.a. Mickey: Everyone's Best Friend
The Mighty Jungle
Ned's Newt
Noah's Ark

P–T
Patrol 03
Pet Central
Pet Cinema - various movies
Pet Docs - various documentaries
Pet Fashion
Pet Friends
Pets and People
Riding High
Twits & Pishers

U–Z
Vets in Hong Kong
Vets on the Wildside
Wild Thing!
Woof!
Working Animals
World's Greatest Pets

Original programming

A–E
Barking!
Barking Mad
Battersea Dogs' Home
Dog-pound Shuffle

F–J
Gentle Doctor
Hollywood Pets
International Animal Emergency

K–O
Lassie
My Magic Dog

P–T
Pet Project
Psycho Kitty
The Right Companion
Sunny's Ears

U–Z
The Vet

External links
 The Pet Network

Pet Network, The